The 1992 Delaware Fightin' Blue Hens football team represented the University of Delaware as a member of the Yankee Conference during the 1992 NCAA Division I-AA football season. Led by 27th-year head coach Tubby Raymond, the Fightin' Blue Hens compiled an overall record of 11–3 with a mark of 7–1 in conference play, winning the Yankee Conference title. Delaware advanced to the NCAA Division I-AA Football Championship playoffs, where the Fightin' Blue Hens beat  in the first round and Northeast Louisiana in the quarterfinals before for losing to the eventual national champion, Marshall, in the semifinals. The team played home games at Delaware Stadium in Newark, Delaware.

Schedule

Roster

References

Delaware
Delaware Fightin' Blue Hens football seasons
Yankee Conference football champion seasons
Delaware Fightin' Blue Hens football